The Russia women's national football team has represented Russia at the FIFA Women's World Cup on two occasions, in 1999 and 2003.

FIFA Women's World Cup record

*Draws include knockout matches decided on penalty kicks.

Record by opponent

1999 FIFA Women's World Cup

Group C

Quarterfinals

2003 FIFA Women's World Cup

Group D

Quarterfinals

Goalscorers

References

 
Countries at the FIFA Women's World Cup